Paddington Station 24/7 is a British documentary television series narrated by Jason Done. It first aired on Channel 5 on 11 September 2017. Series two aired from 26 March 2018, series three aired from 17 September 2018, a special four-part documentary called Paddington: A Year on the Tracks which showed the best bits of series 3 aired between May and June 2020 and the most recent series called Back on the Tracks aired from 26 October 2020.

The first series of the show was aired in Australia on 14 July 2018.

Plot
The documentary series takes you behind the scenes of London Paddington station and their day-to-day activities in and around the station.

Series overview
To date, 4 series have been broadcast, as summarised below.
<onlyinclude>

References

External links

Channel 5 (British TV channel) original programming
2017 British television series debuts
2010s British documentary television series
2020s British documentary television series
British television documentaries
English-language television shows
Documentary television series about railway transport
Rail transport in Great Britain
Television series by ITV Studios